A polity is an identifiable political entity – a group of people with a collective identity, who are organized by some form of institutionalized social relations, and have a capacity to mobilize resources. A polity can be any other group of people organized for governance (such as a corporate board), the government of a country, or of a country subdivision. A polity may be a republic administered by an elected representative, or the realm of a hereditary monarch.

Overview 

In geopolitics, a polity can be manifested in different forms such as a state, an empire, an international organization, a political organization and other identifiable, resource-manipulating organizational structures. A polity like a state does not need to be a sovereign unit. The most preeminent polities today are Westphalian states and nation-states, commonly referred to as countries and also incorrectly referred to by the term nations.

A polity encapsulates a vast multitude of organizations, many of which form the fundamental apparatus of contemporary states such as their subordinate civil and local government authorities. Polities do not need to be in control of any geographic areas, as not all political entities and governments have controlled the resources of one fixed geographic area. The historical Steppe Empires originating from the Eurasian Steppe are the most prominent example of non-sedentary polities. These polities differ from states because of their lack of a fixed, defined territory. Empires also differ from states in that their territories are not statically defined or permanently fixed and consequently that their body politic was also dynamic and fluid. It is useful then to think of a polity as a political community.

A polity can also be defined either as a faction within a larger (usually state) entity or at different times as the entity itself. For example, Kurds in Iraqi Kurdistan are parts of their own separate and distinct polity. However, they are also members of the sovereign state of Iraq which is itself a polity, albeit one which is much less specific and as a result much less cohesive. Therefore, it is possible for an individual to belong to more than one polity at a time. 

Thomas Hobbes was a highly significant figure in the conceptualisation of polities, in particular of states. Hobbes considered notions of the state and the body politic in Leviathan, his most notable work.

Polities do not necessarily need to be governments. A corporation, for instance, is capable of marshalling resources, has a governance structure, legal rights and exclusive jurisdiction over internal decision making. An ethnic community within a country or subnational entity may be a polity if they have sufficient organization and cohesive interests that can be furthered by such organization.

See also 

 Kokutai
Nation
 Politeia
 Political system

References

External links 

 Dictionary of the History of Ideas – analogy of the body politic (elaboration of correspondences between society or the state and the individual human body)
Polity at the Encyclopædia Britannica

Government